Major General Enrique Méndez Jr. Grau (born 15 July 1931),  was a United States Army officer who was also the first Puerto Rican to hold the positions of Army Deputy Surgeon General, Commander of the Walter Reed Army Medical Center and Assistant Secretary of Defense for Health Affairs. He was also the Dean and President of the Ponce School of Medicine in Puerto Rico. Also served as Secretary of Health of Puerto Rico.

Early years
Méndez was born and raised in Santurce, Puerto Rico. His father was a civil engineer and his mother a housewife, he was one of two children born to the couple. He received his primary and secondary education in his native Puerto Rico. During his high school years, Méndez befriended a few physicians who would occasionally invite him to go visit hospitals. He became interested in medicine after witnessing a couple of surgical procedures.

In high school he was one of the founders of Zeta Mu Gamma fraternity in Mayagüez, Puerto Rico.  He enrolled and went to the Mayagüez campus (located on the western coast of the Island) of the University of Puerto Rico, which had a science faculty.  He earned his BS in biology in 1951. He enrolled in the medical school of Loyola University in Chicago and earned his MD degree in 1954.

Military career
Méndez joined the Army after completing his internship at Mercy Hospital in Chicago. He entered the Army as a GMO which stands for "general-duty medical officer" and received his basic training at Fort Sam Houston in Texas. His first assignment was to Camp Gordon, near Augusta, Georgia. His first duty at Camp Gordon was in a dispensary which was an ambulatory care facility. After that assignment and attending the Company Officers' Course and he was reassigned to Brooke General Hospital where he underwent his specialty training (residency) in internal medicine.

In 1960, he was sent to Tripler Army Medical Center in Hawaii. During his service there he had the opportunity to teach interns and residents and set up a dialysis program.

In 1963, Méndez was assigned to Medical Research and Development at Edgewood Arsenal in Maryland, where he served for less than a year and was once more sent to Fort Sam Houston. He was assigned to the Medical Field Service School as an instructor. He helped to establish a biological and chemical sciences branch. In 1967, Méndez, who was then a Lieutenant Colonel, attended the Command General Staff College at Fort Leavenworth. Upon completion of the CGSC, he was sent to Frankfurt, Germany where he became the surgeon of the 3rd Armored Division. He served as such until 1968 when he was sent to an Army base in Vicenza, Italy where he commanded his first U.S. Army Hospital the 45th Field Hospital.

Army Deputy Surgeon General
In 1970, Méndez was promoted to Colonel and assigned to Washington, D.C. as chief of the Medical Corps Career Activities. In 1972, he was selected to go to the Industrial College of the Armed Forces for a year and then he was reassigned to Ft. Sam Houston, Texas to the Academy of Health Sciences. In 1975, he was assigned as the deputy chief of staff for operations of the Health Services Command and subsequently promoted to Brigadier General. Méndez was named Deputy Surgeon General and remained in that position until 1981 when he was named Commander of Walter Reed Army Medical Center. Méndez retired from the Army in June 1983 with the rank of Major General.

Ponce School of Medicine
In 1983, Méndez was offered the position of Dean of the Ponce School of Medicine in Puerto Rico He accepted and moved to the island with his wife. A year later he was named president of the institution. He served in said position for four years after which he accepted the position of Director of Damas Hospital in Ponce. He was appointed Secretary of Health of the Commonwealth of Puerto Rico in 1989.

Assistant Secretary of Defense for Health Affairs

In 1990, Méndez received a phone call from the White House personnel office and was asked whether he would consider the position of Assistant Secretary of Defense for Health Affairs, Department of Defense. On December 5, 1989, President George H. Bush officially announced the nomination of Méndez for the position of Assistant Secretary of Defense for Health Affairs. Among his responsibilities was to give health advice to the Secretary of Defense which at the time was Richard Bruce "Dick" Cheney. He was responsible for a system of health care that included hospitals, medical clinics, and dental clinics scattered worldwide. Méndez served in said position from March 1990 until January 1993.

Méndez joined the firm of Martin, Blanck & Associates, a federal health services consulting firm based in Falls Church, Virginia as a Partner. Dr. Méndez and his wife, the former Olga M. Munoz, have four children and six grandchildren.

Recognitions
Among his numerous awards and honors are the following:

 The Department of Defense Medal for Distinguished Public Service
 The Alumni Award for Loyola University
 The Laureate Award from the American College of Physicians
 The Distinguished Service Award from the Federal Health Care Executives Institute Alumni Association
 The Knight rank from the Order of the Holy Sepulchre
 The Lifetime Achievement Award of the National Puerto Rican Coalition

Honorary degrees
 Doctor of Science from the Universidad Central del Caribe in Puerto Rico
 Doctor, Honoris Causa, from the Military Medical Academy of Poland
 Doctor of Public Service, Honoris Causa, from the University of North Texas-Texas College of Osteopathic Medicine
 Doctor of Education, Honoris Causa, from Caribbean University in Puerto Rico

Military awards and recognitions
Among MG Méndez's military awards are the following:

   Army Distinguished Service Medal
   Legion of Merit  with one oak leaf cluster
   Meritorious Service Medal
   Army Commendation Medal
   National Defense Service Medal
   Order of Military Medical Merit

Badges
   Expert Field Medical Badge

See also

 List of Puerto Ricans
 List of Puerto Rican military personnel

References

Further reading
 "Puertorriquenos Who Served With Guts, Glory, and Honor. Fighting to Defend a Nation Not Completely Their Own"; by : Greg Boudonck; ; 

1931 births
Living people
Loyola University Chicago alumni
People from Santurce, Puerto Rico
Puerto Rican military officers
Puerto Rican Army personnel
Puerto Rican military doctors
United States Army generals
Secretaries of Health of Puerto Rico
Recipients of the Legion of Merit
Recipients of the Distinguished Service Medal (US Army)
United States Army Medical Corps officers
Knights of the Holy Sepulchre
United States Assistant Secretaries of Defense